Stishovite is an extremely hard, dense tetragonal form (polymorph) of silicon dioxide.  It is very rare on the Earth's surface; however, it may be a predominant form of silicon dioxide in the Earth, especially in the lower mantle.

Stishovite was named after Sergey M. Stishov, a Russian high-pressure physicist who first synthesized the mineral in 1961. It was discovered in Meteor Crater in 1962 by Edward C. T. Chao.

Unlike other silica polymorphs, the crystal structure of stishovite resembles that of rutile (TiO2). The silicon in stishovite adopts an octahedral coordination geometry, being bound to six oxides. Similarly, the oxides are three-connected, unlike low-pressure forms of SiO2.  In most silicates, silicon is tetrahedral, being bound to four oxides.  It was long considered the hardest known oxide (~30 GPa Vickers); however, boron suboxide has been discovered in 2002 to be much harder. At normal temperature and pressure, stishovite is metastable.

Stishovite can be separated from quartz by applying hydrogen fluoride (HF); unlike quartz, stishovite will not react.

Appearance
Large natural crystals of stishovite are extremely rare and are usually found as clasts of 1 to 2 mm in length. When found, they can be difficult to distinguish from regular quartz without laboratory analysis. It has a vitreous luster, is transparent (or translucent), and is extremely hard. Stishovite usually sits as small rounded gravels in a matrix of other minerals.

Synthesis
Until recently, the only known occurrences of stishovite in nature formed at the very high shock pressures (>100 kbar, or 10 GPa) and temperatures (> 1200 °C) present during hypervelocity meteorite impact into quartz-bearing rock.  Minute amounts of stishovite have been found within diamonds, and post-stishovite phases were identified within ultra-high-pressure mantle rocks. Stishovite may also be synthesized by duplicating these conditions in the laboratory, either isostatically or through shock (see shocked quartz).
At 4.287 g/cm3, it is the second densest polymorph of silica, after seifertite. It has tetragonal crystal symmetry, P42/mnm, No. 136, Pearson symbol tP6.

See also
 Coesite, a related mineral
 Thaumasite, another rare mineral with hexacoordinated octahedral silica

References

External links
 Properties of stishovite
 Stishovite's origin in meteor impacts

Superhard materials
Impact event minerals
Tetragonal minerals
Minerals in space group 136
Silica polymorphs
Soviet inventions